commonly known as SRC Hiroshima (SRC広島, Esu Eru Shi Hiroshima) is a football (soccer) club based in Hiroshima, which is located in Hiroshima Prefecture in Japan. They play in the Chūgoku Soccer League, which is part of Japanese Regional Leagues.

History
The club was founded in 1953 as a teachers' association club (similar to Tochigi S.C., Gainare Tottori and Renofa Yamaguchi). SRC Hiroshima has been a key-member of Chugoku Soccer League, since they've been a part of this regional league from 1973. They have been relegated to Hiroshima Prefectural League three times, but they have also been promoted back as many times to play again in the actual 5th level of Japanese football. They featured four times in the Emperor's Cup: first in 1996, then again in 2014, 2016 and mostly 2017, when SRC reached 2nd round. In 2016, SRC Hiroshima also won Chugoku Soccer League for the first time. In 2019, they won it for the second time. In 2020, they played an alternative championship (CSL Championship) following the cancelation of the 2020 Japanese Regional Leagues, in which they were crowned with the title after beating Baleine Shimonoseki by the score of 2-0 in the final.

League record 

Key

Honours
Chūgoku Soccer League
 Champions (2): 2016, 2019
CSL Championship
 Champions (1): 2020

Current squad

References

External links
Official Site 
Official Facebook Page
Official Twitter Account

Football clubs in Japan
Sports teams in Hiroshima Prefecture
Association football clubs established in 1953
1953 establishments in Japan